Craig Green  (born 1986) is a British fashion designer specialising in menswear.

Following his BA studies,  during which time he served an internship with Walter van Beirendonck and Henrik Vibskov, Green went on to do a master's degree under the late Professor Louise Wilson, OBE completing the Fashion course at Central Saint Martins.

Career 
For Autumn-Winter 2013, Green presented his first collection as part of a Topman/Fashion East initiative hosted by the British Fashion Council's London Collections: Men event. His work was widely commended in the fashion press, although his debut collection was publicly mocked on national television by the event ambassador, David Gandy. 

Despite this, Green returned to Spring-Summer 2015 with his first solo catwalk presentation, which led to even wider recognition from influential retailers such as Comme des Garçons, who allowed Green to showcase his work in the window of their London store, Dover Street Market. Fashion photographer Nick Knight commented in 2015 that Green's work had opened new avenues for menswear designers by encouraging them to make statements and bolder choices.

Green's work, whilst originally designed as menswear, is noted for its unisex and gender neutral qualities. After recognising that women wore his clothes too, the designer included female models in his catwalk shows. Green told i-D magazine in December 2015 that he felt that the rules regarding gendered clothing were "increasingly blurred," and that it felt like cause for celebration that his clothes could be worn by men and women alike.

In 2014 Green won the British Fashion Award for Emerging Menswear Designer. The following year, in December 2015, two of Green's designs were selected by Gordon Richardson of TopMan to represent the year's leading trends in the Fashion Museum, Bath's Dress of the Year collection. It was the first time since the award was established in 1963 that the selection had been exclusively menswear, although the two outfits were displayed on male and female mannequins to highlight their unisex qualities.

In February 2016, Green collaborated with the Stockholm underwear brand Björn Borg to expand their range with athletic leisurewear.

In 2016, Green started his collaboration with Moncler, with two capsule collections for Autumn Winter 2017 and Spring Summer 2018. Their partnership extended to the new ongoing Moncler Genius project for Autumn Winter 2018 and Spring Summer 2019.

Green was awarded the British Designer of the Year Menswear at the Fashion Awards 2018.

He was appointed Member of the Order of the British Empire (MBE) in the 2022 Birthday Honours for services to fashion.

References

Living people
1986 births
English fashion designers
Menswear designers
Alumni of Central Saint Martins
Members of the Order of the British Empire